Shangshuangtang station is a metro station in Changsha, China. It opened on 28 June 2016.

Station Platform

References

Changsha Metro stations
Railway stations in China opened in 2016